Spyridon Ioannidis (born 25 December 1981) is a Greek boxer. He competed in the men's light welterweight event at the 2004 Summer Olympics.

References

1981 births
Living people
Greek male boxers
Olympic boxers of Greece
Boxers at the 2004 Summer Olympics
Place of birth missing (living people)
Mediterranean Games bronze medalists for Greece
Mediterranean Games medalists in boxing
Competitors at the 2001 Mediterranean Games
Light-welterweight boxers
21st-century Greek people